The Paya Lebar Air Base  is a military airbase of the Republic of Singapore Air Force (RSAF) located at Airport Road in Paya Lebar, in the eastern region of Singapore. The airbase goes by the motto of Strength Through Readiness.

It was originally built in 1954 as Singapore International Airport to replace Kallang Airport; control of the airport was transferred to RSAF in 1980 when it was renamed Paya Lebar Air Base, following the relocation of the civilian airport to Changi.

Under the Urban Redevelopment Authority (URA)'s Master Plan, Paya Lebar Air Base is scheduled to be decommissioned by around 2030 to make way for residential and commercial developments as a new town, with the RSAF relocating to other airbases throughout the country such as at Changi and Tengah, which will be expanded throughout the 2020s.

History
The airport was built from 1952 to 1955, and opened on 20 August that year by the Secretary of State for the Colonies, Alan Lennox-Boyd. The architect for the project was J. J. Bryan, a public works engineer with experience constructing airports in other parts of Asia.

It was one of the two hubs for Malayan Airways at this time, and the airline had its first flight outside Southeast Asia in 1958, using a DC-4 plane leased from Qantas, flying to Hong Kong. Turboprops were introduced over the next few years, and the name was changed to Malaysian Airways.

In 1962, a joint RAF/Singapore civil Air Traffic Control service was formed to provide Military cover for Air Defence. During that time Britannia aircraft of British Eagle provided transport for the British military. Comet 4C's were common traffic and the new VC10 arrived reducing flight time, rather than the 24hrs-with stops- of the Britannia.

In 1966, the company focused more on Singapore, buying Boeing 707s, headquartering itself in that country, and renaming itself Malaysia-Singapore Airlines – with a notable fluorescent yellow livery. Its primary hub became Paya Lebar, and services began to reach out further into North Asia.

From 1979 to 1980, British Airways, in conjunction with Singapore Airlines, began supersonic Concorde services from London's Heathrow Airport, to Paya Lebar Singapore.

Malaysia-Singapore Airlines was dissolved in 1972, with the airline splitting into two; Malaysia Airlines and Singapore Airlines were formed – the latter keeping all the 707s; and Singapore Airlines remaining at Paya Lebar. Passenger numbers rose from 1.7 million to 4 million between 1970 and 1975. The airport was constrained by housing estates and although some work was done to keep it operational in the meantime, construction began on the new airport in 1975 and opened in 1981. Paya Lebar then closed to civil traffic, the IATA airport code of SIN and the ICAO airport code of WSSS were transferred to the newly opened civilian airport in Changi.

Conversion to military use
Singapore International Airport began to be gradually converted into a military air-force base from late 1967 onwards. During that year, an Air Movement Centre was constructed to handle passengers and cargo arriving on Republic of Singapore Air Force, and Ministry of Defence charter flights and foreign military aircraft. The original terminal building (painted green), maintenance hangar and control tower are retained. Access to terminal and hangars are off-limits closed off by a wired fence. It became a complete military airbase in 1981 when Singapore Changi Airport was opened and was subsequently renamed as Paya Lebar Air Base (PLAB) in the same year.

Paya Lebar Air Base
The air base currently houses aircraft such as the C-130 Hercules and two squadrons of F-15SG Strike Eagles.

The flying squadrons are:
122 Squadron with 10 C-130 Hercules,
142 Squadron with 15 F-15SG Strike Eagles,
149 Squadron with >24 F-15SG Strike Eagles

The support squadrons are:
Air Logistics Squadron (ALS)
Airfield Maintenance Squadron (AMS)
Field Defence Squadron (FDS)
Flying Support Squadron (FSS)

Former squadrons based here are:
141 Squadron with F-5S/T, RF-5S
144 Squadron with F-5S/T

Use by the United States Air Force
Under Singapore's permission, the Paya Lebar Airbase is also used by various flying units of United States Air Force and United States Navy (including United States Marine Corps Aviation) as a strategic refuelling stopover and staging post/transit point; the base is also used permanently by the 497th Combat Training Squadron for other flight operations since 31 October 1991.

Paya Lebar Air Base also plays host to USAF VIP aircraft as well, with regular visits by Air Force One, such as during President George W. Bush's two visits to Singapore in October 2003 and November 2006.

Air Force Two carrying Vice-President Dick Cheney also made a refuelling stop and underwent minor repairs en route from Australia in 2007.

The USAF Boeing 747-200 E-4B regularly lands at the base when the U.S. Secretary of Defense visits Singapore, as does the Boeing 757 C-32A that carries the Secretary of State.

On 14 November 2009, Air Force One carrying President Barack Obama landed at Paya Lebar Air Base to attend the APEC Singapore 2009 Summit.

On 10 June 2018, President Donald Trump landed at the airbase in the Boeing VC-25A for the 2018 North Korea–United States summit. North Korean leader Kim Jong Un landed at Changi Airport instead, on a chartered Air China Boeing 747.

On 22 August 2021, Air Force Two carrying Vice-President Kamala Harris arrived at the airbase for an official visit.

2018 North Korea–United States summit

PLAB was chosen to host Air Force One for the 12 June 2018 North Korea–United States summit between President Donald Trump and Chairman Kim Jong-un. Although early media reports speculated that Kim's Ilyushin Il-62 would land at PLAB, his plane landed at Singapore Changi Airport instead.

On 6 June 2018, Singapore's aviation authorities announced temporary airspace restrictions that was put in place for parts of 11–13 June. Aircraft arriving at Singapore Changi Airport was required to reduce speed with some restrictions on runway use. Aviators were also informed to keep a distance from Paya Lebar Air Base as it is a high-security facility used by U.S presidents on their previous visits to Singapore. Kim landed in Singapore Changi Airport on 10 June. After the summit, Trump and Air Force One left Singapore via PLAB at 6:30 pm Singapore Time.

Decommissioning
The airbase is expected to be decommissioned from 2030. Throughout the 2020s, expansion works are currently ongoing at Tengah Air Base and Changi Air Base to prepare for the eventual relocation of RSAF's assets after the closure of the airbase.

With the closure of the airbase, height restrictions imposed at Singapore's central business district (CBD) which limits buildings to a maximum height of 280 meters unless special permissions are granted will be lifted, and the airbase's area will be redeveloped into a new town with residential housing projects, offices, factories, and parks. Parts of the old airbase (e.g. runway) will also be integrated to this new town to conserve its heritage, with parks and museums.

Photo gallery

Legacy
Being Singapore's first major international airport, the old passenger terminal building and control tower still stands, though they now house air force units and are off-limits to the public. Nevertheless, much of the interior still remains intact and is almost completely preserved from the time it was first built. The road which used to lead to the old passenger terminal is also still known as Airport Road.

Air Force Museum

The RSAF maintains the Air Force Museum, which is open to the public and showcases the air force's history and capabilities. The museum is located at 400 Airport Road, Singapore 534234 beside the airbase. It went through an upgrade and update of the exhibits in 2015.

See also

Task Force 73/Commander, Logistics Group Western Pacific

References

External links

RSAF web page on Paya Lebar Air Base (PLAB)

Military airbases established in 1955
Airports in Singapore
Camps and bases of the Singapore Armed Forces
Air Base
Republic of Singapore Air Force bases
1955 establishments in Singapore
Singapore–United States military relations
20th-century architecture in Singapore